Georgetown-Rowley State Forest is a  Massachusetts state forest located primarily in the towns of Georgetown and Rowley with a small spillage into the town of Boxford. The forest straddles Interstate 95 and abuts Willowdale State Forest at its southeastern edge. The forest is managed by the Massachusetts Department of Conservation and Recreation.

Activities and amenities
Trails: Trails include a section of the Bay Circuit Trail and are used for hiking, walking, mountain biking, horseback riding, cross-country skiing and snowmobiling.
The forest offers hunting with some restrictions.

References

External links
Georgetown-Rowley State Forest Department of Conservation and Recreation

Massachusetts state forests
Georgetown, Massachusetts
Rowley, Massachusetts
Bay Circuit Trail
Protected areas of Essex County, Massachusetts